Immergut is a German surname, which means 'Always Well'. Notable people with the surname include:

 Ellen M. Immergut, political scientist
Karin Immergut (born 1960), American judge
Mel Immergut, American lawyer

See also
 Immergut Festival

German-language surnames